or Internet, is a software company based in Osaka, Japan. It is best known for the music sequencer Singer Song Writer and Niconico Movie Maker for Nico Nico Douga, a video sharing website. It also develops singing synthesizers using the Vocaloid 4 engine developed by Yamaha Corporation. In 2014, they were the second leading company in sound-related software in Japan, boasting a 14.0% share of the market.

Products and services

Music composition

Internet started their Vocaloid development with the first Vocaloid 2 singing synthesizer Gackpoid on July 31, 2008, whose voice was provided by Japanese international singer Gackt. Gackpoid includes OPUS Express for mixing vocal parts with accompaniment or phoneme data.

The second product, Megpoid, was released on June 25, 2009 and is voiced by Megumi Nakajima. Due to the success of Crypton Future Media's "Append" series, Internet announced they will be working on an updated version of Megpoid called Megpoid Extend in 2011.

Yamaha's first Vocaloid called Lily was later sold via Internet's website. Internet also released Gachapoid based on the voice of Gachapin, a popular Japanese television character. Gackpoid, Megpoid and Lily would also be released in Taiwan.

Vocaloid 2

Vocaloid 3

Vocaloid 4

Vocaloid 6

Upcoming products
Internet's other music composers include:
 Singer Song Writer (SSW) - a music sequencer
 Mixture - a music composer
 VST Software Instrument LinPlug series - synthesizers and samplers

Sound editing and recording
 OPUS (Optical Practical Ultimate Sound Design) - a multi-track sound designer
 Sound it! - a sound editor and recorder
 Degiroku Studio

Video
 Video Save - a video downloader and converter for video-sharing websites
 Niconico Movier Maker (NMM)

Other
 Mobile VIVO 1816 Save vivo 1816 - a data backup tool for VIVO 1816

References

External links 
  
 LinPlug Virtual Instruments GmbH

Software companies of Japan
Companies based in Osaka Prefecture
Vocaloid production companies